Digital Dictator is the second studio album by the American heavy metal band Vicious Rumors, released in 1988 through Shrapnel Records (United States) and Roadrunner Records (Europe); a remastered edition was reissued in 2009.

Track listing

Personnel
Vicious Rumors
Carl Albert – lead vocals
Geoff Thorpe – guitar, background vocals
Mark McGee – guitar, mandolin, background vocals
Dave Starr – bass, background vocals
Larry Howe – drums, background vocals

Additional musicians
John Lavaysse – background vocals
Dino Alden – background vocals, assistant engineer

Production
Dave Starr – mixing
Dino Alden – engineer (assistant)
Guy Aitchison – cover art
Steve Pollutro – logo
George Horn – mastering at Fantasy Studios, Berkeley, California
Rocky Ball – photography
Geoff Thorpe – cover concept, mixing, producer
Mark McGee – mixing
Doug Troxell – photography, production manager, sleeve design
Steve Fontano – producer, engineer, mixing
Rick Likong – photography
John Umphrey – photography
Stephanie Ball – photography
Tim Gennert – remastering (reissue)

References

Vicious Rumors albums
1987 albums
Shrapnel Records albums
Roadrunner Records albums